Grace Stewart (born 28 April 1997) is an Australian field hockey player. She represented her country at the 2016 Summer Olympics.

Career

Junior National Team
Grace Stewart was a member of Australian Under 21 side, the 'Jillaroos', at the 2016 Junior World Cup. She scored three goals in the tournament, helping Australia to a bronze medal finish.

Senior National Team
Stewart debuted for the Hockeyroos in 2016 in a three-nations series in Singapore. She also scored in her debut match against Germany.

Stewart has been a regular player for the Australian side since her debut, appearing at both the Olympics and the Commonwealth Games.

Stewart qualified for the Tokyo 2020 Olympics. She was part of the Hockeyroos Olympics squad. The Hockeyroos lost 1-0 to India in the quarterfinals and therefore were not in medal contention.

International Goals

References

External links
 
 
 

1997 births
Living people
Australian female field hockey players
Field hockey players at the 2016 Summer Olympics
Olympic field hockey players of Australia
Place of birth missing (living people)
Commonwealth Games medallists in field hockey
Commonwealth Games silver medallists for Australia
Female field hockey forwards
Field hockey players at the 2018 Commonwealth Games
Field hockey players at the 2020 Summer Olympics
Field hockey players at the 2022 Commonwealth Games
20th-century Australian women
21st-century Australian women
Medallists at the 2018 Commonwealth Games
Medallists at the 2022 Commonwealth Games